Mario Barone (born January 2, 1948) is an Italian-born Canadian former soccer player who played as a forward.

Career 
Barone played in the Toronto and District Soccer League in the Fifth Division with Catanzaro in 1964. In 1967, he played with Italia in the First Division of the Toronto and District League. He also played at the high school level and graduated from Central Technical School. In 1968, he played in the North American Soccer League with Toronto Falcons. In his debut season with Toronto he played in nine matches and recorded one goal.  

The following season he played in the National Soccer League with Toronto Italia. In his debut season in the NSL he assisted Italia he securing the NSL Cup. In 1972, he returned to the Toronto and District League and played with Vittore-San Marco.

References  
 

Living people
1948 births
Association football forwards
Canadian soccer players
Italian footballers
Toronto Falcons (1967–68) players
Toronto Italia players
North American Soccer League (1968–1984) players
Canadian National Soccer League players
Soccer people from Ontario